The 2020 BC Lions season was scheduled to be the 63rd season for the team in the Canadian Football League (CFL) and their 67th overall. Training camps, pre-season games, and regular season games were initially postponed due to the COVID-19 pandemic. The CFL announced on April 7, 2020 that the start of the 2020 CFL season would not occur before July 2020. On May 20, 2020, it was announced that the league would likely not begin regular season play prior to September 2020. On August 17, 2020 however, the season was officially cancelled due to COVID-19.

This would have been the third season with Ed Hervey as the Lions' general manager. The Lions' incumbent head coach, DeVone Claybrooks, was fired on November 6, 2019 after one season. Rick Campbell was announced as the team's head coach on December 2, 2019.

The Lions were scheduled to hold their training camp at Hillside Stadium in Kamloops, British Columbia for the 11th straight year. However, due to the COVID-19 pandemic in British Columbia, this was postponed and the Lions will fulfill the last year of their contract in 2021.

Offseason

CFL National Draft
The 2020 CFL National Draft took place on April 30, 2020. The Lions were scheduled to select third in each round, less any traded picks, after finishing third-last in the 2019 league standings. However, the club traded their third and 12th overall selections to the Calgary Stampeders in exchange for the first and 15th overall picks. Selecting first overall for the first time since the 1999 CFL Draft, the Lions selected linebacker, Jordan Williams.

The Lions acquired an additional fifth-round pick after trading a negotiation list player and a fourth-round pick to the Stampeders for Justin Renfrow. The team also sent a sixth-round selection to Montreal in part of the trade for Tyrell Sutton.

CFL Global Draft
The 2020 CFL Global Draft was scheduled to take place on April 16, 2020. However, due to the COVID-19 pandemic, this draft and its accompanying combine were postponed to occur just before the start of training camp, which was ultimately cancelled. The Lions were scheduled to select third in each round with the number of rounds never announced.

Planned schedule

Preseason

Regular season

Team

Roster

Coaching staff

References

External links
 

BC Lions seasons
BC Lions
BC Lions season